Peterman, Alabama may refer to:
Peterman, Houston County, Alabama, an unincorporated community
Peterman, Monroe County, Alabama, a census-designated place